The Gunrunner is a Canadian crime drama film directed by Nardo Castillo and starring Kevin Costner.

Cast
Kevin Costner as Ted Beaubien
Sara Botsford as Maud Ryan
Paul Soles as Lochman
Gerard Parkes as Wilson
Ron Lea as George
Mitch Martin as Rosalyn
Larry Lewis as Robert
Daniel Nalbach as Max

Reception
William Thomas of Empire awarded the film two stars out of five.  Leonard Maltin gave it one and a half stars.

References

External links
 
 

Canadian crime drama films
English-language Canadian films
New World Pictures films
1980s English-language films
1980s Canadian films